Delaware and Hudson Canal Gravity Railroad Shops was a historic gravity railroad maintenance facility located at Carbondale, Lackawanna County, Pennsylvania. They were built as part of the Delaware and Hudson Gravity Railroad.

It was added to the National Register of Historic Places in 1978.  It was delisted in 1987, after being demolished.

References

Transportation buildings and structures in Lackawanna County, Pennsylvania
Former National Register of Historic Places in Pennsylvania
National Register of Historic Places in Lackawanna County, Pennsylvania
Carbondale, Pennsylvania